Mahatma Gandhi Medical College and Research Institute (MGMCRI) also called French: Collège médical et institut de recherche Mahatma Gandhi is a medical college and hospital located in the Bahour taluk of the union territory of Puducherry, India. The institute is run by the institution of Sri Balaji Educational and Charitable Public Trust (SBECPT) and founded by chairman, Shri M.K. Rajagopalan.

The institution is recognized by the Medical Council of India, Ministry of Health and Family Welfare of the Government of India, and the Government of Puducherry. M.G.M.C.R.I was affiliated to Pondicherry University. M.G.M.C.R.I was recognized as a deemed university by university grants commission, New Delhi, on 4 August 2008.

The campus is situated at Pillayarkuppam,  from the city of Pondicherry, near the town of Cuddalore.

History 
In building this institution, Mr. M. K. Rajagopal, the young chairman, was assisted by Prof. Rajaram Pagadala, an eminent medical teacher, an able administrator and an efficient clinician, as the first director, CEO and dean of the MGMCRI. Prof. Rajaram had the experience of having been the dean of three other medical schools, including JIPMER in Pondicherry, College of Medical Sciences, Bharatpur in Nepal and Alluri Sita Ramaraju Academy of Medical sciences (ASRAM) in Eluru in Andhra Pradesh. He was decorated by the President of India as an Eminent Medical teacher of India and was awarded with Dr. B.C. Roy Award in 1993.

Dr DS Dubey took charge as the director and dean of the institution in 2002. Dr Dubey, an excellent administrator, teacher and clinician, had served as director of many institutions across India, including JIPMER. He also served as an inspector to the prestigious Medical Council of India. It was during his tenure the institution took complete shape and received international reputation. The period referred to as The Golden Period of MGMCRI. He held the office till the first batch of MBBS students passed out of the institution. Dr James Gnanadoss served as the director of the institute after the tenure of Dr Dubey.The first batch of this college started in 2002 April. Post graduate teaching began in April 2007. Its alumni association came into existence on 16 August 2007 and is known as Mahathma Gandhi Medical College and Research Institute Fraternity (MGMCRI Fraternity).

Departments

Clinical departments

Apart from the complete gamut of specialities ranging from general surgery to radiology, the hospital also conducts special clinics in liaison between different clinical departments such as
Arthroplasty Clinic	
Leprosy Clinic
Cancer Clinic	
Pain Clinic
Child Guidance Clinic  	
Pre-anaesthesia assessment Clinic
De-addiction Clinic	
Spine Clinic
Dermatosurgery Clinic	
Sports medicine and arthroscopy Clinic
Diabetology Clinic	
STD Clinic
Hypertension Clinic	
Well-baby Clinic
Infertility Clinic
 Mental Health Clinic
Recent additions include cardiology, cardiothoracic surgery, neurology and neurosurgery in addition to urology and pediatric surgery

Preclinical and paraclinical departments
Biophysics	
Medical Education Unit
Community Medicine	
Medical Genetics
Forensic Medicine 	
Medical Illustration Unit
Human Anatomy	
Medical Microbiology
Human Physiology 	
Pathology
Medical Biochemistry	
Pharmacology

List of postgraduate courses

MD Course

Para Clinical
Anatomy
Bio-chemistry
Community medicine
Forensic Medicine
Microbiology
Pathology
Pharmacology
Physiology

Clinical
Anaesthesiology
Dermatology, Venereology &  Leprosy
General Medicine
Paediatrics
Psychiatry
Radiology
Tuberculosis & Chest Diseases ( Pulmonary Medicine)

MS Courses
General Surgery
Obstetrics & Gynaecology
Ophthalmology
Orthopaedics
Otorhinolaryngology

Rankings

The National Institutional Ranking Framework (NIRF) ranked Mahatma Gandhi Medical College & Research Institute 47 among 50 participating Medical Institutions in India.

See also
List of medical colleges in India
Mahatma Gandhi Institute of Medical Sciences

References

External links 

 

Medical colleges in India